Santiago Daniel Micolta Lastra (born 26 May 2000) is an Ecuadorian footballer who plays as a forward for Serie A de México side Deportiva Venados.

Career statistics

Club

Notes

References

2000 births
Living people
Ecuadorian footballers
Ecuadorian expatriate footballers
Association football forwards
Unión La Calera footballers
Ecuadorian Serie A players
Chilean Primera División players
Ecuadorian expatriate sportspeople in Chile
Expatriate footballers in Chile